WPOT (1500 AM) is a radio station broadcasting a Christian radio format. Licensed to Trenton, Tennessee, United States, the station is currently owned by Grace Broadcasting Services and features programming from Westwood One. The station went silent on July 1, 2009.

On April 20, 2018, WPOT changed their format from southern gospel to a simulcast of Pure Country Radio-formatted WJPJ 1190 AM Humboldt.

References

External links

Radio stations established in 1983
POT